Taskin (also Romanized as Taskīn; also known as Taskīn-e Soflá) is a village in Gilvan Rural District, in the Central District of Tarom County, Zanjan Province, Iran. At the 2006 census, its population was 816, in 195 families.

References 

Populated places in Tarom County